Barthold Charles (Bart) de Liefde (born 18 September 1976 in London) is a Dutch former politician and field hockey umpire. As a member of the People's Party for Freedom and Democracy (Dutch: Volkspartij voor Vrijheid en Democratie) he was an MP between 26 October 2010 and 19 February 2016. He focused on matters of culture, sports and games of chance.

In January 2016 De Liefde announced he would resign in February 2016 to become a manager at Uber. On 1 March 2016 he was replaced by Remco Bosma.

He was a member of the municipal council of The Hague from April 2006 to March 2010 and from June to October 2010.

De Liefde studied public administration at Thorbecke Academy in Leeuwarden (BA) and at Leiden University (MA).

References 
  Parlement.com biography

External links 
 Bart de Liefde personal website 
 House of Representatives biography  
 People' Party for Freedom and Democracy website 

1976 births
Living people
Dutch referees and umpires
Dutch corporate directors
Dutch public relations people
Dutch lobbyists
Field hockey umpires
Leiden University alumni
Members of the House of Representatives (Netherlands)
Municipal councillors of The Hague
People's Party for Freedom and Democracy politicians
21st-century Dutch politicians